Turbonilla obeliscus is a species of sea snail, a marine gastropod mollusk in the family Pyramidellidae, the pyrams and their allies.

Description
The shell grows to a length of 6.4 mm.

Distribution
This species occurs in the following locations:
 Caribbean Sea : Jamaica
 Gulf of Mexico
 Atlantic Ocean : North Carolina, United States

References

External links
 To Biodiversity Heritage Library (6 publications)
 To Encyclopedia of Life
 To ITIS
 To World Register of Marine Species

obeliscus
Gastropods described in 1850